Michele Galdieri (1902–1965) was an Italian screenwriter, songwriter and lyricist. Along with Giovanni D'Anzi, he composed the popular song Mattinata fiorentina (Morning Florence) for the 1941 revue Sometimes It's Nice to Go on Foot.

Selected filmography
 Three Lucky Fools (1932)
 Five to Nil (1932)
 Father For a Night (1939)
 Baron Carlo Mazza (1948)
 Tears of Love (1954)

References

Bibliography 
 Miguel Mera & David Burnand. European Film Music. Ashgate Publishing, 2006.

External links 
 

1902 births
1965 deaths
20th-century Italian screenwriters
Italian male screenwriters
Writers from Naples
20th-century Italian male writers